Bannout is a Lebanese surname. Notable people with the surname include:

Samir Bannout (born 1955), Lebanese bodybuilder
Mohammad Bannout (born 1976), Lebanese bodybuilder, nephew of Samir

Surnames of Lebanese origin